The Min River or Min Jiang is a  in central Sichuan province, China. It is a tributary of the upper Yangtze River which it joins at Yibin. Within China, it was traditionally taken as the main course of the upper Yangtze prior to extensive exploration of its sources.

Geography
The Min River flows in the general southern direction. It starts in north-central Sichuan, where its basin is limited by the Qionglai Mountains in the west and the Min Mountains in the east. The river passes through the Longmen Mountains and enters the plains of the Sichuan Basin near Dujiangyan. In that area, the ancient Irrigation System and the modern Zipingpu dam are located. The Giant Buddha of Leshan is built into the stone banks of the Min river.

Names
Some 19th-century Western authors used the name Blue River as the "colloquial name" for the Minjiang, after the former local Chinese name Qingshui (lit. "Clear water"), and the belief that the Min constituted the main course of the Yangtze, which was itself known to Europeans as the "Blue River".

Wildlife
A survey by biologist Deng Qixiang found that only 16 of the 40 fish species recorded in the 1950s can be found today. The Sichuan Taimen, a protected species, has not been seen in one stretch of river, the Wenchuan, for an entire decade.

History
Located along the Min River is the oldest surviving water management scheme built by hydraulic engineer Li Bing, helping to greatly expand the power of the Qin state, and triggering a population boom in the Chengdu plain. It was built about 2,300 years ago. The first western academic to research its history was Joseph Needham. The scheme became known as the Dujiangyan Irrigation System.

Dams
The Min is being heavily developed, primarily for hydroelectric power. A total of 27 dams are completed, under construction or planned for the river, as of March 2014. Those dams are listed below from downstream to upstream.
Pianchuangzi Dam – Planned, 740 MW
Longxikou Dam – Planned, 360 MW
Jianwei Dam – Planned, 360 MW
Shazui Dam – Planned, 250 MW
Banqiaoxi Dam – Planned, 30 MW
Yangliuhu Dam – Planned, 76.5 MW
Zipingpu Dam – Completed, 760 MW
Yingxiuwan Dam – Completed, 135 MW
Taipingyi Dam – Completed, 260 MW
Futangba Dam – Completed, 360 MW
Shaba Dam – Under construction, 720 MW
Jiangsheba Dam – Completed, 96 MW
Yangmaoping Dam – Planned, 3.4 MW
Tongzhong Dam – Completed, 49.5 MW
Nanxin Dam – Completed, 9.6 MW
Shigu Dam – Completed, 2.7 MW
Zongqu Dam – Planned, 2 MW
Yaneryan Dam – Planned, 66 MW
Feihongqiao Dam – Planned, 120 MW
Jinlongtan Dam – Completed, 180 MW
Tianlonghu Dam – Completed, 180 MW
Xiaohaizi Dam – Completed, 48 MW
Lianhuayan Dam – Planned, 111 MW
Wulibao Dam – Planned, 157 MW
Longpan Dam – Planned, 72.6 MW
Xiningguan Dam – Planned, 37.2 MW
Hongqiaoguan Dam – Planned, 68.5 MW

See also
List of rivers in China

References

Rivers of Sichuan
Tributaries of the Yangtze River